Nathan Donald Diaz (born April 16, 1985) is an American professional mixed martial artist who is currently a free agent. Diaz is most known for his time spent fighting in the Ultimate Fighting Championship (UFC), where he fought for over 15 years after winning The Ultimate Fighter 5. Prior to signing with the UFC, Diaz competed in World Extreme Cagefighting, Strikeforce, and Pancrase. Diaz has the third most UFC bonus awards, with 16 in total.

Background 
The son of Melissa (née Womble) and Robert Diaz, he was born of Mexican and Anglo heritage and raised in Stockton, California with his brother Nick and sister Nina. He attended Tokay High School and, at the age of 11, he began training in martial arts with his brother, Nick.

Mixed martial arts career

Early career

Prior to his official MMA career, Diaz competed in a bare knuckle MMA fight against Robert Limon on July 20, 2002, at the age of 17. Footage has since emerged of the fight and it is believed to be his first competitive experience.

Upon making his official professional MMA debut, Diaz competed mainly for World Extreme Cagefighting (WEC). In 2006, at WEC 24, he fought for the WEC Lightweight Championship against then-champion Hermes França, losing by submission in the second round. This was the last event held by WEC before it was acquired by Zuffa, LLC, then parent company of the UFC.

Ultimate Fighting Championship

The Ultimate Fighter 5

Diaz was a contestant on The Ultimate Fighter 5, which exclusively featured lightweights, fighting on Jens Pulver's team. In the preliminary round, Diaz defeated Rob Emerson by submission; in the quarterfinals he defeated fellow Team Pulver teammate Corey Hill via triangle choke submission in the first round. In the semifinals, Diaz defeated Team Penn member Gray Maynard by submission, advancing to the finals, in which he faced teammate Manvel Gamburyan. Diaz won by submission after Gamburyan was forced to tap out in the second round due to the dislocation of his right shoulder as the result of attempting a takedown. With the victory, Diaz won The Ultimate Fighter 5.

2008

After defeating Alvin Robinson and Junior Assunção via submission, Diaz demanded tougher opponents. He was given a match with Kurt Pellegrino at UFC Fight Night 13. Diaz defeated Pellegrino via triangle-choke submission in the second round. As he locked up the choke, Diaz had time to flex for the crowd and throw up double middle fingers before Pellegrino submitted. Diaz then defeated veteran Josh Neer by split decision in the main event of UFC Fight Night 15.

2009

Diaz next fought former Strikeforce Lightweight Champion Clay Guida at UFC 94: St. Pierre vs. Penn 2, losing via split decision. Guida used his wrestling to take Diaz down multiple times. Guida won via split decision, marking Diaz's first loss in the UFC, in what was also his pay per view debut.

Diaz met fellow Ultimate Fighter winner and former King of the Cage Welterweight Champion Joe Stevenson at The Ultimate Fighter 9 Finale. Stevenson took Diaz down at will throughout the 3 rounds and Diaz lost by unanimous decision.

After two consecutive losses by decision, Diaz was billed to headline UFC Fight Night 19 opposite Melvin Guillard. Diaz won by submission to a guillotine choke at 2:30 of round 2.

2010

Diaz faced Gray Maynard on January 11, 2010, in the main event at UFC Fight Night 20, a rematch from when the two met in the semi-finals of the TUF 5 lightweight tournament, which Diaz won. Diaz lost a controversial split decision to Maynard, as the former TUF winner was given the nod in the FightMetric reports, winning rounds two and three.

After three losses in four fights, Nate considered making a permanent move up in weight to the 170 lb. weight class, stating "I don't make enough money to have to drop this much weight so I'd like to fight at 170 and only go to 155 every once in a while."

Diaz made his Welterweight debut on March 27, 2010, at UFC 111 against Miletich Fighting Systems product and striking specialist Rory Markham. At the weigh-ins, Markham weighed in at 177, whereas Diaz weighed in at the Welterweight limit of 171; the fight was changed to a catchweight fight. Diaz went on to win the fight by TKO in the first round.

After the win over Markham, Diaz stated he would compete in both weight classes. His next fight was again at Welterweight against former professional boxer Marcus Davis on August 28, 2010 at UFC 118. Diaz finished Davis after choking him unconscious with a guillotine choke submission in the final round; the bout earned Fight of the Night honors.

2011

Diaz next faced South Korean fighter Dong Hyun Kim, on January 1, 2011, at UFC 125. Diaz lost the fight via unanimous decision.

Diaz fought Rory MacDonald on April 30, 2011, at UFC 129.  Diaz was unable to mount much significant offense and lost via unanimous decision. Following the loss, Diaz stated that he would be moving back down to the lightweight division.

Diaz defeated former PRIDE Lightweight Champion Takanori Gomi on September 24, 2011, at UFC 135 via armbar submission in the first round. He earned Submission of the Night honors for his performance.

Diaz defeated Donald Cerrone at UFC 141 via unanimous decision (30–27, 30–27, and 29–28) in a performance that earned both participants Fight of the Night honors. Despite being knocked off of his feet multiple times by sweeping leg kicks from Cerrone, Diaz had one of the best performances of his career. Diaz set a CompuStrike record, landing 82% of the strikes he threw en route to his victory over Cerrone.

2012

Diaz, after several years of training, finally received his Brazilian jiu-jitsu black belt from Cesar Gracie. He was awarded his black belt a month before his fight with fellow Brazilian jiu-jitsu black belt Jim Miller.

Diaz next faced Jim Miller on May 5, 2012, at UFC on Fox 3. Diaz outboxed Miller for the majority of the first two rounds, even dropping Miller with a straight left at the end of the first round. Near the end of round two, Miller shot in for a takedown, to which Diaz stuffed and countered with a rolling guillotine choke, forcing the tap at 4:09 of the second round. The submission won Diaz his fifth Submission of the Night bonus award. It was also the first time Miller had been stopped in his MMA career.

Diaz faced Benson Henderson on December 8, 2012, at UFC on Fox 5 in the main event for the UFC Lightweight Championship. Diaz lost the one-sided bout via unanimous decision. Three weeks prior to the championship bout, Diaz signed an eight-fight contract with UFC.

2013

Diaz faced former Strikeforce Lightweight Champion Josh Thomson on April 20, 2013, at UFC on Fox 7. He lost the fight via TKO due to a head kick and punches, during which Nate's brother, Nick Diaz physically threw a towel into the octagon, in an attempt to signal the referee to end the bout. On May 16, 2013, Diaz was suspended by the UFC for violating the UFC's code of conduct by using a homophobic slur on his Twitter page. The UFC expressed their disappointment and suspended him; he was eventually suspended for 90 days and fined $20,000.

A rubber match with Gray Maynard took place on November 30, 2013 in the main event at The Ultimate Fighter 18 Finale. Diaz won via TKO in the first round. The stoppage earned him his first Knockout of the Night bonus.

2014

On May 5, 2014, both Nate Diaz and fellow UFC fighter T. J. Grant were removed from the UFC's lightweight rankings after being deemed inactive by the UFC.

After over a year away from the sport, Diaz returned from his self-imposed hiatus and faced Rafael Dos Anjos on December 13, 2014 at UFC on Fox 13.  Diaz missed weight, coming in at 160.6 pounds. He was given additional time to make the lightweight limit, and cut down to 155.2.   However, he was still fined 20 percent of his purse, which went to Rafael dos Anjos. Diaz, who seemed unmotivated and annoyed for most of the fight, lost the one-sided fight via unanimous decision (30–26, 30–26, and 30–27).

2015

Diaz was briefly linked to a welterweight bout with Matt Brown on July 11, 2015 at UFC 189.  However, in mid-April, Brown announced that the pairing had been scrapped.

After sitting out again for over a year, Diaz returned to face Michael Johnson on December 19, 2015 at UFC on Fox 17. He won the fight via unanimous decision and went on to give one of the most infamous post-fight interviews in UFC history, where he called out Conor McGregor by saying "you're taking everything I work for, motherfucker, and I'ma fight your fucking ass" on live broadcast television.  Both participants were awarded Fight of the Night honors.

2016

Diaz was set as a replacement to face Conor McGregor on March 5, 2016 at UFC 196, filling in for an injured Rafael dos Anjos. With Diaz only having eleven days notice, the fight took place at welterweight (170 lbs) due to lack of time to cut weight. Diaz won the fight via submission in the second round. This gave Diaz his ninth submission victory in the UFC, tied for the second-most all-time behind only Royce Gracie. Both fighters were awarded Fight of the Night honors and Diaz was also awarded with the Performance of the Night bonus.

A rematch with McGregor was scheduled for July 9, 2016 at UFC 200. However, on April 19, the UFC announced that McGregor had been pulled from the event after failing to fulfill media obligations in Las Vegas related to the fight. In turn, the fight with McGregor was rescheduled and took place the following month, contested again at welterweight, at UFC 202. Diaz lost the rematch via majority decision. The contest was once again awarded Fight of the Night honors.

At the UFC 202 post-fight press conference, Diaz violated the USADA rule by smoking CBD, Cannabidiol, vape pen within four hours after a fight. He was not sanctioned as CBD is not considered a PED. USADA changed their rules and lifted CBD from the banned list not long after.

2018

After a two-year-long layoff, it was announced on August 3, 2018, that Diaz was expected to return on November 3 against Dustin Poirier in a lightweight bout. This bout was expected to serve as the co-headliner of UFC 230. However, on October 9, 2018, it was announced that Poirier pulled out due to injury and as a result, the bout was canceled.

2019
Nate Diaz returned to competition on August 17 at UFC 241. He faced Anthony Pettis in a welterweight bout which served as the co-main event. With a dominant performance, he won the fight by unanimous decision.

Diaz faced Jorge Masvidal on November 2, 2019 in the main event of UFC 244. In a unique situation, UFC President Dana White confirmed that the headlining bout was for a celebratory "baddest motherfucker" (‘BMF’) belt. After being dominated for most of the fight, Diaz lost the fight via TKO between rounds three and four when the cage-side physician determined a cut over Diaz's right eye rendered him unable to continue.

2021
Diaz was expected to face Leon Edwards on May 15, 2021 at UFC 262 in the event's co-headliner, marking the first time a non-main event and non-title bout had been scheduled for 5 rounds. However, the bout was moved to UFC 263 due to a minor injury sustained by Diaz and eventually took place for five rounds as well. Edwards controlled a vast majority of the bout, but was stunned badly with punches late in the fifth. Edwards won the fight by unanimous decision (49–46, 49–46, 49–46).

2022
On the last fight of his UFC contract, Diaz was scheduled to face Khamzat Chimaev on September 10, 2022 in the main event of UFC 279. However, at the weigh-ins on September 9, Chimaev weighed in at 178.5 pounds, seven-and-a-half pounds over the welterweight non-title fight limit. As a result of Chimaev missing weight, he was removed from his bout with Diaz. Diaz instead faced Tony Ferguson in the main event. Diaz won the fight via a guillotine choke submission in the fourth round. This win earned Diaz his second Performance of the Night bonus award. Diaz opted to not re-sign with the UFC before the bout with Ferguson, thus making Diaz a free agent once the fight concluded.

Personal life
Diaz's brother Nick is also a professional MMA fighter fighting under UFC.  Both Diaz brothers are advocates for cannabis and even have a licensed line of marijuana pre-rolls made by California Finest. They currently run a Brazilian jiu-jitsu school in Stockton, California (Nick Diaz Academy), and founded a CBD company called Game Up Nutrition. He has been primarily vegan since he was 18, but admits to eating fish from time to time. On June 20, 2018, it was announced that Diaz's girlfriend had given birth to their daughter.

In August 2022, Diaz publicly endorsed fellow UFC veteran BJ Penn in his run for governor for Hawaii.

In September 2022, Diaz announced the news that he was starting his own combat sports promotion company, Real Fight Inc. As a result of the attention that Diaz had brought to the city of Stockton, he was presented with a key to the city by the mayor during a Stockton Kings basketball game in December 2022.

Controversy

Diaz was involved in a brawl backstage at the Anderson Silva v Jake Paul boxing match and was removed from the event as a result.

Championships and accomplishments
Ultimate Fighting Championship
The Ultimate Fighter 5 winner
Fight of the Night (Eight times) vs. Josh Neer, Clay Guida, Joe Stevenson, Marcus Davis, Donald Cerrone, Michael Johnson, & Conor McGregor (2) 
Knockout of the Night (One time) vs. Gray Maynard 
Performance of the Night (Two times) vs. Conor McGregor and Tony Ferguson
Submission of the Night (Five times)  Alvin Robinson, Kurt Pellegrino, Melvin Guillard, Takanori Gomi, & Jim Miller
Tied (Jim Miller) for second most submission wins in UFC Lightweight division history (7)
Tied (Frankie Edgar, Edson Barboza & Dustin Poirier) for most Fight of the Night bonuses in UFC history (8)
Third most Post Fight bonuses in UFC history (16)
Fourth most submissions in UFC history (10)
MMAJunkie.com
2016 March Fight of the Month vs. Conor McGregor
2016 August Fight of the Month vs. Conor McGregor
2019 November Fight of the Month vs. Jorge Masvidal
Sherdog
2011 All-Violence First Team
World MMA Awards
2016 Submission of the Year vs. Conor McGregor at UFC 196
Wrestling Observer Newsletter
2016 Feud of the Year vs. Conor McGregor

Mixed martial arts record

|-
|Win
|align=center|21–13
|Tony Ferguson
|Submission (guillotine choke)
|UFC 279
|
|align=center|4
|align=center|2:52
|Las Vegas, Nevada, United States
|
|-
|Loss
|align=center|20–13
|Leon Edwards
|Decision (unanimous)
|UFC 263
|
|align=center|5
|align=center|5:00
|Glendale, Arizona, United States
|
|-
|Loss
|align=center|20–12
|Jorge Masvidal
|TKO (doctor stoppage)
|UFC 244
|
|align=center|3
|align=center|5:00
|New York City, New York, United States
|
|-
|Win
|align=center|20–11
|Anthony Pettis
|Decision (unanimous)
|UFC 241
|
|align=center|3
|align=center|5:00
|Anaheim, California, United States
|
|-
|Loss
|align=center|19–11
|Conor McGregor
|Decision (majority)
|UFC 202
|
|align=center|5
|align=center|5:00
|Las Vegas, Nevada, United States	
|
|-
|Win
|align=center|19–10
|Conor McGregor
|Submission (rear-naked choke)
|UFC 196
|
|align=center|2
|align=center|4:12
|Las Vegas, Nevada, United States
|
|-
|Win
|align=center|18–10
|Michael Johnson
|Decision (unanimous)
|UFC on Fox: dos Anjos vs. Cowboy 2
|
|align=center|3
|align=center|5:00
|Orlando, Florida, United States
|
|-
|Loss
|align=center|17–10
|Rafael dos Anjos
|Decision (unanimous)
|UFC on Fox: dos Santos vs. Miocic
|
|align=center|3
|align=center|5:00
|Phoenix, Arizona, United States
|
|-
|Win
|align=center|17–9
|Gray Maynard
|TKO (punches)
|The Ultimate Fighter: Team Rousey vs. Team Tate Finale
|
|align=center|1
|align=center|2:38
|Las Vegas, Nevada, United States
|
|-
| Loss
|align=center|16–9
|Josh Thomson
|TKO (head kick and punches)
|UFC on Fox: Henderson vs. Melendez
|
|align=center|2
|align=center|3:44
|San Jose, California, United States
|
|-
| Loss
|align=center|16–8
|Benson Henderson
|Decision (unanimous)
|UFC on Fox: Henderson vs. Diaz
|
|align=center|5
|align=center|5:00
|Seattle, Washington, United States
|
|-
|Win
|align=center|16–7
|Jim Miller
|Submission (guillotine choke)
|UFC on Fox: Diaz vs. Miller
|
|align=center|2
|align=center|4:09
|East Rutherford, New Jersey, United States
|
|-
|Win
|align=center|15–7
|Donald Cerrone
|Decision (unanimous)
|UFC 141
|
|align=center|3
|align=center|5:00
|Las Vegas, Nevada, United States
|
|-
|Win
|align=center|14–7
|Takanori Gomi
|Submission (armbar)
|UFC 135
|
|align=center|1
|align=center|4:27
|Denver, Colorado, United States
|
|-
|Loss
|align=center|13–7
|Rory MacDonald
|Decision (unanimous)
|UFC 129
|
|align=center|3
|align=center|5:00
|Toronto, Ontario, Canada
|
|-
|Loss
|align=center|13–6
|Dong Hyun Kim
|Decision (unanimous)
|UFC 125
|
|align=center|3
|align=center|5:00
|Las Vegas, Nevada, United States
|
|-
|Win
|align=center|13–5
|Marcus Davis
|Technical Submission (guillotine choke)
|UFC 118
|
|align=center|3
|align=center|4:02
|Boston, Massachusetts, United States
|
|-
|Win
|align=center|12–5
|Rory Markham
|TKO (punches)
|UFC 111
|
|align=center|1
|align=center|2:47
|Newark, New Jersey, United States
|
|-
|Loss
|align=center|11–5
|Gray Maynard
|Decision (split)
|UFC Fight Night: Maynard vs. Diaz
|
|align=center|3
|align=center|5:00
|Fairfax, Virginia, United States
|
|-
|Win
|align=center|11–4
|Melvin Guillard
|Submission (guillotine choke)
|UFC Fight Night: Diaz vs. Guillard
|
|align=center|2
|align=center|2:13
|Oklahoma City, Oklahoma, United States
|
|-
|Loss
|align=center|10–4
|Joe Stevenson
|Decision (unanimous)
|The Ultimate Fighter: United States vs. United Kingdom Finale
|
|align=center|3
|align=center|5:00
|Las Vegas, Nevada, United States
|
|-
|Loss
|align=center|10–3
|Clay Guida
|Decision (split)
|UFC 94
|
|align=center|3
|align=center|5:00
|Las Vegas, Nevada, United States
|
|-
|Win
|align=center|10–2
|Josh Neer
|Decision (split)
|UFC Fight Night: Diaz vs. Neer
|
|align=center|3
|align=center|5:00
|Omaha, Nebraska, United States
|
|-
|Win
|align=center|9–2
|Kurt Pellegrino
|Submission (triangle choke)
|UFC Fight Night: Florian vs. Lauzon
|
|align=center|2
|align=center|3:06
|Broomfield, Colorado, United States
|
|-
|Win
|align=center|8–2
|Alvin Robinson
|Submission (triangle choke)
|UFC Fight Night: Swick vs. Burkman
|
|align=center|1
|align=center|3:39
|Las Vegas, Nevada, United States
|
|-
|Win
|align=center|7–2
|Junior Assunção
|Submission (guillotine choke)
|UFC Fight Night: Thomas vs. Florian
|
|align=center|1
|align=center|4:10
|Las Vegas, Nevada, United States
|
|-
|Win
|align=center|6–2
|Manny Gamburyan
|TKO (shoulder injury)
|The Ultimate Fighter: Team Pulver vs. Team Penn Finale
|
|align=center|2
|align=center|0:20
|Las Vegas, Nevada, United States
|
|-
|Loss
|align=center|5–2
|Hermes França
|Submission (armbar)
|WEC 24
|
|align=center|2
|align=center|2:46
|Lemoore, California, United States
|
|-
|Win
|align=center|5–1
|Dennis Davis
|Submission (keylock)
|Warrior Cup 1
|
|align=center|1
|align=center|2:00
|Stockton, California, United States
|
|-
|Win
|align=center|4–1
|Joe Hurley
|Submission (triangle choke)
|WEC 21
|
|align=center|2
|align=center|2:03
|Highland, California, United States
|
|-
|Win
|align=center|3–1
|Gilbert Rael
|TKO (punches)
|WEC 20
|
|align=center|1
|align=center|3:35
|Lemoore, California, United States
|
|-
|Win
|align=center|2–1
|Tony Juares
|TKO (punches)
|Strikeforce: Shamrock vs. Gracie
|
|align=center|1
|align=center|3:23
|San Jose, California, United States
|
|-
|Loss
|align=center|1–1
|Koji Oishi
|Decision (unanimous)
|Pancrase: 2005 Neo-Blood Tournament Finals
|
|align=center|3
|align=center|5:00
|Tokyo, Japan
|
|-
|Win
|align=center|1–0
|Alejandro Garcia
|Submission (triangle choke)
|WEC 12
|
|align=center|3
|align=center|2:17
|Lemoore, California, United States
|
|}

|-
|Win
|align=center|3–0
|Gray Maynard
|Submission (guillotine choke)
|rowspan=3|The Ultimate Fighter 5
| (air date)
|align=center|2
|align=center|1:17
|rowspan=3|Las Vegas, Nevada, United States
|
|-
|Win
|align=center|2–0
|Corey Hill
|Submission (triangle choke)
| (air date)
|align=center|1
|align=center|3:02
|
|-
|Win
|align=center|1–0
|Rob Emerson
|Submission (rear-naked choke)
| (air date)
|align=center|2
|align=center|4:45
|

Pay-per-view bouts

See also
 List of male mixed martial artists

References

External links

Official UFC Profile

1985 births
Living people
American male mixed martial artists
Mixed martial artists from California
American mixed martial artists of Mexican descent
Lightweight mixed martial artists
Welterweight mixed martial artists
Mixed martial artists utilizing Brazilian jiu-jitsu
The Ultimate Fighter winners
American practitioners of Brazilian jiu-jitsu
Sportspeople from Stockton, California
People from Lodi, California
People awarded a black belt in Brazilian jiu-jitsu
American cannabis activists
Ultimate Fighting Championship male fighters